The ambassador of Colombia to the United States is the ambassador extraordinary and plenipotentiary of the Republic of Colombia to the United States of America, accredited as Concurrent Non-Resident Ambassador to the Islamic Republic of Afghanistan.

The Ambassador is Colombia's foremost diplomatic representative to the United States, and Chief of Mission in Washington, D.C. The Ambassador however, is not the only Colombian diplomat in the United States, the other two being the Permanent Representative of Colombia to the Organization of American States also in Washington, D.C., and the Permanent Representative of Colombia to the United Nations in New York City. The officeholder is charged with representing the interests of the president and government of Colombia, and advancing the accredited countries.

The current ambassador is Luis Gilberto Murillo.

Envoys

Ambassadors

See also

 Embassy of Colombia, Washington, D.C.
 United States Ambassador to Colombia
 Colombia – United States relations

References

 
Colombia
United States